The Fishguard Volcanic Group is an Ordovician lithostratigraphic group (a sequence of rock strata) in west Wales. The name is derived from the town of Fishguard in Pembrokeshire. This assemblage of rocks has also been referred to as the Fishguard Volcanic Series or Fishguard Volcanic Complex. These rocks are believed to be the source of the 'bluestones' which form a part of the well-known prehistoric monument of Stonehenge in southern England.

Outcrops
The rocks are intermittently exposed in a belt of country running east from Strumble Head on the Cardigan Bay coast, through Fishguard and wrapping around the northern flanks of Mynydd Preseli to the south of the village of Newport to the vicinity of Crymych.

Lithology and stratigraphy
The group comprises about 1800 m thickness of lavas, breccias tuffs and associated volcaniclastic sediments laid down in the marine Welsh Basin during the Llanvirnian stage of the Ordovician Period. The group includes (in descending order, i.e. oldest last) the Goodwick Volcanic Formation, the Strumble Head Volcanic Formation and the Porth Maen Melyn Volcanic Formation. Previous names for these divisions which may be found in the literature are 'Upper Rhyolite Division', 'Pillow-lava Division' and 'Lower Rhyolite Division. The  Llanrian Volcanic Formation is recognised within the Strumble Head area. It is composed of acid tuffs.

References

Ordovician System of Europe
Middle Ordovician Series
Geology of Wales